Anthela ekeikei is a moth of the Anthelidae family. It is found in New Guinea

References

Moths described in 1904
Anthelidae